The Guadalupita-Coyote Rural Historic District is a historic district in Mora County, New Mexico which was listed on the National Register of Historic Places in 2017.

It includes the village of Guadalupita, parts of Guadalupita and Williams canyons, and the Coyote Creek valley between Guadalupita and Lucero.

The Guadalupita/Coyote Historic District was listed on New Mexico's Register of Cultural Properties in 2011.  Ownership of a historic church property in Guadalupita was in dispute in 2017.

References

Historic districts on the National Register of Historic Places in New Mexico
National Register of Historic Places in Mora County, New Mexico
Mission Revival architecture in New Mexico
Traditional Native American dwellings
Buildings and structures completed in 1910